Dr. Gustavo J. Vollmer Herrera (5 January 1923 – 2 November 2014) of Venezuela was an industrialist and prominent philanthropist.

Background
Vollmer, alongside his brother Alberto J. Vollmer Herrera are the patriarchs of the Vollmer clan in Venezuela, the country's oldest business dynasty. Although extremely low profile, the Vollmer family maintains an active ownership and management role in a wide variety of business operations across the agricultural, consumer goods and financial services sectors. The family leads and controls Mercantil Servicios Financieros, the country's leading financial services institution in banking and insurance, with Vollmer's eldest son currently serving as Chairman and CEO. They also own and operate Venezuela's largest rum distillery and one of the worldwide leaders in premium rums, Santa Teresa Rum located in El Consejo, Aragua, as well as Central El Palmar, a vast sugarcane refinery, mill and plantation the family owns in neighboring San Mateo, Aragua. 

The Vollmer family are also renowned for backing the funding and development of numerous education initiatives across Venezuela. Among the most prominent was their 1963 donation to the Jesuit order of an 80-acre portion of their Hacienda Montalban, in central Caracas, to build what is today the Universidad Católica Andrés Bello, one of the top universities in Venezuela and Latin America. The family is also active in promoting photography, art and culture through the Alberto Vollmer Foundation, and runs several award-winning initiatives in social development and inclusion through the Santa Teresa Foundation.

Vollmer graduated with a degree in Civil Engineering from Cornell University in Ithaca, New York, USA.

Vollmer also served as President of the National Council of the Asociación de Scouts de Venezuela, President of the Interamerican Regional Scout Council, and as a member of the World Scout Committee of the World Organization of the Scout Movement from 1963 to 1969 and again from 1973 to 1979.

In 1969, Vollmer was awarded the Bronze Wolf, the only distinction of the World Organization of the Scout Movement, awarded by the World Scout Committee for exceptional services to world Scouting, at the 22nd World Scout Conference. He also received the Silver Buffalo in 1965, and the highest distinction of the Scout Association of Japan, the Golden Pheasant Award, in 1968.

References

Further reading
Dr. László Nagy, 250 Million Scouts, The World Scout Foundation and Dartnell Publishers, 1985, complete list through 1981

Recipients of the Bronze Wolf Award
World Scout Committee members
1923 births
Scouting and Guiding in Venezuela
Cornell University alumni

2014 deaths